The United States Senate election of 1940 in Connecticut was held on November 5, 1940. Incumbent Democratic Senator Francis T. Maloney was re-elected to a second term in office. Maloney did not complete the term; he died in 1945.

General election

Candidates
Paul L. Cornell (Republican and Union)
James A. Hutchin (Socialist Labor)
Francis T. Maloney, incumbent Senator since 1935 (Democratic)
Kenneth W. Thurlow (Socialist)
Isadore Wofsy (Communist)

Results

References

Connecticut
1940
1940 Connecticut elections